Bestrma is a village in central Croatia, in the municipality of Sunja, Sisak-Moslavina County. It is located in the Banija region.

History

Demographics
According to the 2011 census, the village of Bestrma has 86 inhabitants. This represents 29.66% of its pre-war population according to the 1991 census. 

The 1991 census recorded that 81.38% (236/290) of the village population were ethnic Serbs, 12.76% were Yugoslavs (37/290), 2.07% were Croats (6/290) and 3.79% were of other/unknown ethnic origin (11/290).

NOTE: From 1957-1971 includes data for Blinjska Greda settlement. From 1981 census on, Blinjska Greda settlement is reported separately.

Notable natives and residents

References 

Populated places in Sisak-Moslavina County
Serb communities in Croatia